Mary Howarth (1858 – ) was a British journalist and newspaper editor.

Howarth was born in Manchester. She was the editor of the women's section for the Daily Mail in the late 1890s.  In November 1903, she was appointed as the first editor of the Daily Mirror, then part of the same group.

Although sometimes described as the first female editor on Fleet Street, she was preceded by Delariviere Manley and Rachel Beer.  Almost all the staff at the Mirror were women, proprietor Alfred Harmsworth saw it as a paper "for gentlewomen by gentlewomen".

The first issue sold a relatively healthy 276,000 copies, but was soon down to 25,000. Harmsworth lost confidence in his plan for the paper.  According to him, "women can't write and don't want to read". He wrote to Hamilton Fyfe to offer him the job of editor. Fyfe replied, confirming that he would be happy to take up the post, as soon as he could resign as editor of the Morning Advertiser. 

Howarth, apparently only on loan from the Mail, returned to her former job at the Mail after a week's publication. Fyfe took up the editorial post early in 1904, sacking almost all the female staff.  He relaunched the paper with a focus on printing photographs of events.

References

Journalists from Manchester
Date of birth missing
Year of death missing
British newspaper editors
Daily Mirror people
1858 births
Date of death missing